is a Japanese football player who currently plays for SC Sagamihara.

Club statistics
Updated to 23 February 2018.

References

External links
Profile at Tochigi SC

1987 births
Living people
Hannan University alumni
Association football people from Yamaguchi Prefecture
Japanese footballers
J1 League players
J2 League players
J3 League players
Júbilo Iwata players
Albirex Niigata players
Tochigi SC players
Yokohama FC players
SC Sagamihara players
Association football goalkeepers